Teven is a village located on the Far North Coast of New South Wales (in Australia).

Administratively it is part of the Ballina Shire.

Demographics 
There were 250 usual residents living in Teven.  Of this count, 130 (or 52%) were males and 120 (or 48%) were females. The median age for persons living in Teven was 44 years. By age, 20% of the population were under 15 years old, 75% were between 15 and 65, and 5% were over 65 years old.
Most people living in Teven were born in Australia (85%).

Economy 

The median family income was $1,083 per week and the median household income in 2006 was $1,228 per week.

There were 134 people employed in 2011 (to give an employment to working age population ratio of 0.73), and 5 people unemployed.  The most common occupations were Managers (21%); Technicians and Trade Workers (20%); and, Labourers (15%).  The top 5 industries for employment were 
Fruit and Tree Nut Growing (12%),
Sheep, Beef Cattle and Grain Farming (5%),
Supermarket and Grocery Stores (4%),
School Education (4%) and 
Adult, Community and Other Education (4%).

Housing 

This equated to marginally under 29% of median household income. The median rent was $190 per week. This equated to just over 15% of median household income.
The average household size was 3 persons.

Mayor 

The Unofficial Mayor of Teven is Mr Michael Murphy. A resident, farmer and local legend. Michael was one of the original local residents responsible for building and maintaining the near by cricket oval located in Tintenbar.

References 

Northern Rivers
Ballina Shire